Katie Dippold (born January 10, 1980) is an American screenwriter. She was a writer on the NBC series Parks and Recreation and wrote The Heat starring Sandra Bullock and Melissa McCarthy and the 2016 Ghostbusters reboot.

Life and career
Dippold was born and raised in Freehold Township, New Jersey, and graduated from Rutgers University with a degree in journalism.

After graduating college, Dippold started a career in improvisational comedy at Upright Citizens Brigade Theatre (UCBT) in New York City. She wrote and performed in various stage shows at the UCBT in New York City and still continues to perform improv on stage at the UCBT's venue in Los Angeles. She is a part of improv groups "The Smokes" and "Reuben Starship". Dippold has appeared as a sketch regular on Late Night with Conan O'Brien and was a cast member on the MTV comedic prank series Boiling Points. In 2006, she became a writer for the twelfth season of MADtv and was also a co-producer during its fourteenth season. In 2009, she joined the writing staff of Parks and Recreation where she worked for several seasons.

Dippold wrote the screenplay for the comedic film The Heat (2013), starring Sandra Bullock and Melissa McCarthy, and directed by Paul Feig.  Dippold and director Feig co-wrote the 2016 Ghostbusters all-female reboot. She also wrote the Disney re-worked adaptation of The Haunted Mansion. Haunted Mansion is set for release on July 28, 2023.

She was listed in 2012 under "10 Screenwriters to Watch" by Variety and "13 People to Look Out For in 2013" in Interview.

Personal life
Dippold is in a long-term relationship with film studio executive Drew Crevello.

Filmography

Film

Television

Acting credits

References

External links
 
 

1980 births
Living people
Actresses from New Jersey
American television actresses
American women television producers
American television writers
People from Freehold Township, New Jersey
Rutgers University alumni
American women comedians
American women screenwriters
American women television writers
Upright Citizens Brigade Theater performers
Screenwriters from New Jersey
21st-century American comedians
21st-century American women writers
Comedians from New Jersey
21st-century American screenwriters
Television producers from New Jersey